Turklish, a portmanteau of "Turkish (Türkçe)" and "English (İngilizce)", refers to the language contact phenomenon that occurs primarily where native Turkish speakers frequently communicate in English. The term is first recorded in 1994. The term does not refer to English spoken with a Turkish accent, but rather to code switching between the two languages. 

Turklish is found in Turkish expatriate communities in the United States, Canada, the United Kingdom, Australia, among the students of the many English speaking universities, high schools and corporations of Istanbul and other major cities. To a lesser extent, the same phenomenon can be observed in expatriate communities in Turkey.

Turklish speakers borrow a considerable amount of their vocabulary from English while speaking Turkish. It is not uncommon for a speaker of Turklish to frequently switch back and forth between the two languages, sometimes mid-sentence. 

Sometimes, some English idioms and proverbs are directly translated into Turkish, and vice versa. Also, in Turklish the gender pronouns "he" "she" and "it" are sometimes (not always) neutral and can be used interchangeably.

References

Turkish diaspora
Macaronic language